John Gunter may refer to:

John Gunter (football manager), secretary-manager of Middlesbrough F.C.
John Gunter (footballer), Australian rules footballer

See also
John Gunther (1901–1970), American journalist and author
John Gunther (public servant) (1910–1984), Australian public servant